Futuro Antico may refer to:

 Futuro Antico (band)
 "Futuro antico" I & II, two songs from the 1989 album Visions by Andrea Centazzo
 Futuro antico I to VIII, a series of albums released by Angelo Branduardi between 1996 and 2014